Nototriton guanacaste also called the Volcan Cacao moss salamander is a species of salamander in the family Plethodontidae.
It is endemic to the Cordillera de Guanacaste, Costa Rica.

Its natural habitat is tropical moist montane forests.

References

Nototriton
Amphibians of Costa Rica
Endemic fauna of Costa Rica
Taxonomy articles created by Polbot
Amphibians described in 1993